Ashley Marsters (born 2 November 1993) is an Australian rugby union player.

Biography 
Marsters was selected for the Australian squad to the 2014 Women's Rugby World Cup in France. She played for Australia A at the 2019 Oceania Rugby Women's Championship in Fiji.

Marsters was named in the Wallaroos squad for test matches against Fiji and Japan in May 2022. She was then selected for the 2022 Pacific Four Series competition that was held in New Zealand. She came off the bench against the Black Ferns in the opening match of the Pacific Four series on 6 June.

Marsters made the Wallaroos squad for a two-test series against the Black Ferns at the Laurie O'Reilly Cup. She was selected in the team again for the delayed 2022 Rugby World Cup in New Zealand.

References

External links
Wallaroos Profile

1993 births
Living people
Australia women's international rugby union players
Australian female rugby union players
20th-century Australian women
21st-century Australian women